Synclera stramineatis is a moth in the family Crambidae. It was described by Jagbir Singh Kirti in 1993. It is found in Arunachal Pradesh, India.

References

Moths described in 1993
Spilomelinae
Moths of Asia